Francisco 'Fran' Carbià Barrera (born 31 March 1992) is a Spanish footballer who plays mainly as a left winger for CF Badalona Futur.

Club career
Born in Tarragona, Catalonia, Carbià finished his development with hometown club Gimnàstic de Tarragona. He was promoted to the farm team in 2010, making his debut for the latter in the Tercera División.

Carbià was an unused substitute in a 3–1 Segunda División away win against FC Cartagena on 17 March 2012, and appeared with the main squad in the 2011 and 2012 pre-seasons, although his spell was mainly associated to the reserves. On 8 July 2013, he agreed to a contract with Segunda División B club CF Reus Deportiu.

On 20 November 2015, as his contract was due to expire, Carbià renewed his link until 2017, and contributed four goals in 33 appearances as his side achieved promotion to division two for the first time ever. He made his professional debut on 27 August 2016, starting and scoring the first in a 1–1 home draw against CD Mirandés.

On 16 October 2016, Carbià scored a brace in a 2–0 win at UCAM Murcia CF. Six days later he closed the 2–1 home victory over CD Lugo, taking his tally up to five in the first 11 matches.

On 28 December 2018, Carbià was one of the five players who left Reus due to unpaid wages. The following 11 January, he signed with FC Dinamo Tbilisi for five months.

Carbiá returned to the Spanish third tier in the summer of 2019, joining UD Ibiza on a two-year deal. The following transfer window, he moved to Gimnàstic de Tarragona in the same league on loan until 30 June. On 2 September 2020, he agreed to a permanent contract at the latter side.

References

External links

1992 births
Living people
Sportspeople from Tarragona
Spanish footballers
Footballers from Catalonia
Association football wingers
Segunda División players
Segunda División B players
Tercera División players
Primera Federación players
Segunda Federación players
CF Pobla de Mafumet footballers
CF Reus Deportiu players
UD Ibiza players
Gimnàstic de Tarragona footballers
Erovnuli Liga players
FC Dinamo Tbilisi players
Spanish expatriate footballers
Expatriate footballers in Georgia (country)
Spanish expatriate sportspeople in Georgia (country)